William Spring Hubbell (January 17, 1801 – November 16, 1873) was an American politician and Democratic member of the U.S. House of Representatives from New York, serving one term from 1843 to 1845.

Biography 
He was born in Painted Post (Steuben County), New York.  He was postmaster and later town clerk of Bath, New York, then a member of the state assembly in 1841.

Congress 
He was elected as a Democrat to the 28th Congress (March 4, 1843 – March 3, 1845), and was a delegate to the Democratic National Convention at Charleston, South Carolina, in 1860.

Death 
William Spring Hubbell died in Bath, New York.  His home at Bath, known as the George W. Hallock House, was listed on the National Register of Historic Places in 2004.

References

External links

1801 births
1873 deaths
People from Painted Post, New York
New York (state) postmasters
Democratic Party members of the New York State Assembly
Democratic Party members of the United States House of Representatives from New York (state)
People from Steuben County, Indiana
19th-century American politicians